The  or  is a major thoroughfare in Brussels, Belgium. It was originally commissioned by King Leopold II as part of his building campaign, and was finished in 1897, in time for the Brussels International Exhibition of that year. 

Geographically, the Avenue de Tervueren forms a continuation of the Rue de la Loi/Wetstraat, which ends at the western end of the Parc du Cinquantenaire/Jubelpark, running from Merode station in the west, connecting with Marshal Montgomery Square, passing through the municipality of Woluwe-Saint-Pierre and the Ring at /, and finishing at the park in Tervuren. A tunnel starting just west of the Robert Schuman Roundabout takes the Rue de la Loi's main lane under the Cinquantenaire (with a short uncovered section in the centre of the park), and emerges at Merode as the Avenue de Tervueren's central lane.

Tram route 44 follows a large portion of the Avenue de Tervueren, from Montgomery station all the way to Tervuren. For much of the distance, it has a dedicated track. The road also has a cycle path for much of its length.

Events
The annual Festival of the Avenue de Tervueren takes place each May. The road is closed to motor traffic from Merode down to Woluwe Park, market stalls and a flea market are set up and various family attractions and amusements draw crowds. In past years, the celebration has included fireworks, live music and events such as the cooking of a giant omelette. The celebration marks the anniversary of the road's opening.

Notable buildings
The Avenue de Tervueren is home to many buildings in Beaux-Arts, Art Nouveau, Art Deco and eclectic styles, as well as the Brussels Tram Museum.

 No. 68–70: Former Institute for the Treatment of Eye Diseases of Doctor Coppez (1912) by 
 No. 110: Beaux-Arts apartment building (1927) by Antoine Varlet
 No. 166: Beaux-Arts hôtel particulier (1913) by Franz D'Ours
 No. 279–281: Stoclet Palace, a private mansion in the Vienna Secession style (1905–1911) by Josef Hoffmann, and a UNESCO World Heritage Site

See also

 List of streets in Brussels
 Art Nouveau in Brussels
 Art Deco in Brussels
 History of Brussels
 Belgium in "the long nineteenth century"

References

Notes

Tervueren
Etterbeek
Tervuren
Woluwe-Saint-Pierre